The 2010–11 Standard Bank Pro20 was the eighth season of the Standard Bank Pro20 Series, established by the Cricket South Africa. The series was played between 28 January – 13 March 2011.

Venues

Rules and regulations
The tournament is divided into a group stage and a knockout stage. In the group stage, teams face each other in a single round-robin tournament. At the end of the group stage, the top four teams qualify for the semi-finals. The semi-finals are best-of-three playoffs, with the top seed facing the fourth seed and the second seed facing the third seed. If a match in the knockout stage ends with a tie, a Super Over will determine the winner. The winners of the semi-finals play a single final match to determine the winner of the tournament.

For each group stage match, the host of the match alternates between tournaments. Each team hosts either two or three of their five matches. In the knockout stage, the higher seed hosts the second and third (if required) matches while the lower seed hosts the first match.

Points were awarded as follows in the group stage:

 The team that achieves a run rate of 1.25 times that of the opposition shall be rewarded one bonus point.
 A team's run rate will be calculated by reference to the runs scored in an innings divided by the number of overs faced.
 Points are deducted for slow over rate at 1 point per over not completed within the allotted 90 minutes.

Teams and standings

(C) = Eventual champion; (R) = Runner-up.
Note: The winner and runner-up qualified for the 2011 Champions League Twenty20.

Results

Group stage

Knockout stage

Fixtures
All times shown are in South African Standard Time (UTC+02).

Group stage

Knockout stage

Semi-finals

Final

References

External links
 Tournament Page – ESPN CricInfo

South African domestic cricket competitions
Standard Bank Pro20
2010–11 South African cricket season